The Saint Stephens meridian, in longitude 88° 02′ west from Greenwich, begins at the initial point (Ellicott's Corner), on the base line, in latitude 31° north, passes through Saint Stephens, Alabama, extends south to Mobile Bay and north to latitude 33° 06′ 20″, and governs the surveys in the southern district of Alabama, and in Pearl River district lying east of the river and south of the Choctaw Baseline, in latitude 31° 52′ 40″ north, in the state of Mississippi.

Sources

See also
List of principal and guide meridians and base lines of the United States

External links

Meridians and base lines of the United States
Named meridians
Geography of Alabama